Nuno Miguel da Costa Jóia (born 10 February 1991), known as Nuno da Costa, is a Cape Verdean professional footballer who plays as a forward for Ligue 1
side Auxerre.

Raised in France, he began his senior career with Aubagne in the fifth tier before moving to Valenciennes of Ligue 2 in 2015. Two years later he debuted in Ligue 1 with Strasbourg, where he won the Coupe de la Ligue in 2019. In January 2020, he signed for Nottingham Forest.

Da Costa scored on his senior international debut for Cape Verde in June 2016.

Club career

Early career
Born in Praia, Cape Verde, Da Costa was raised in Portugal from 1993 and began playing with U.R. Mercês in Lisbon. He then moved to Aubagne in southern France, where he started his senior career with Aubagne FC in France's fifth tier. 

On 4 January 2014, Da Costa scored the opening goal of a 3–3 draw at home to Ligue 2 club Dijon FCO in the last 64 of the Coupe de France, losing on penalties.

Valenciennes
Da Costa joined Valenciennes FC of Ligue 2 on 3 August 2015, following a season of 14 goals and eight assists. In his first professional season, he scored ten goals, including two on 6 May 2016 in a 4–1 win away to relegated Paris FC. He followed this with nine more in his second year, including a brace in a 3–3 home draw with FC Bourg-Peronnas on 18 November.

Strasbourg
On 3 July 2017, Da Costa signed a four-year deal with Ligue 1 club RC Strasbourg, replacing Khalid Boutaïb who had left for Malatyaspor. In his first top-flight season he found the net five times, including both goals of a 2–1 win at OGC Nice on 22 October that earned him a place in L'Équipes team of the week. On 4 November, he was sent off after half an hour of a 2–0 loss at Troyes AC.

Da Costa was an 81st-minute substitute for Lebo Mothiba as they won the 2019 Coupe de la Ligue Final on penalties against EA Guingamp on 30 March. Four days later, he scored twice in a 4–0 win over Stade Reims at the Stade de la Meinau, part of his eight of the season. After that game, former France international Daniel Bravo described Da Costa's goal as "not bad for a black guy" during his beIN Sports punditry; he apologised in person for offence caused to the player, who accepted the apology.

Nottingham Forest
On 29 January 2020, da Costa joined EFL Championship club Nottingham Forest. The length and cost of the deal was not disclosed. He debuted on 11 February in a 1–0 home loss to Charlton Athletic, playing the last twenty minutes in place of Ryan Yates; days later he was injured in an under-23 game against Crewe Alexandra.

Da Costa was loaned to Belgian First Division A side Royal Excel Mouscron for the season on 5 October 2020, with the option to make the deal permanent. He scored six goals during his stint, including both of a 2–2 home draw with OH Leuven on 15 December.

On 31 August 2021, Da Costa was loaned out again for a year, returning to the French Ligue 2 at Caen.

Auxerre
On 5 August 2022, Da Costa joined Ligue 1 side AJ Auxerre.

International career
Da Costa made his international debut for Cape Verde on 4 June 2016 in a 2017 Africa Cup of Nations qualification match away to São Tomé and Príncipe. He came on in the 73rd minute for Garry Rodrigues, and six minutes later scored in a 2–1 win. He did not play again until the return of manager Rui Águas on 9 September 2018, in a 1–1 draw away to Lesotho in the unsuccessful 2019 Africa Cup of Nations qualification campaign.

Career statistics

Club

International

Scores and results list Cape Verde's goal tally first, score column indicates score after each da Costa goal.

Honours
Strasbourg
Coupe de la Ligue: 2018–19

References

External links

 

1991 births
Living people
Sportspeople from Praia
Association football forwards
Cape Verdean footballers
Cape Verde international footballers
Portuguese footballers
Portuguese people of Cape Verdean descent
Cape Verdean expatriate footballers
Cape Verdean emigrants to Portugal
Ligue 1 players
Ligue 2 players
Championnat National 3 players
Valenciennes FC players
RC Strasbourg Alsace players
Expatriate footballers in France
Nottingham Forest F.C. players
Cape Verdean expatriate sportspeople in England
Royal Excel Mouscron players
Cape Verdean expatriate sportspeople in Belgium
Expatriate footballers in England
Expatriate footballers in Belgium
Aubagne FC players
Stade Malherbe Caen players
AJ Auxerre players